Pindi Mana (Urdu:  پنڈی  ماناں) is a village in the administrative tehsil Shakargarh, Narowal district, in Pakistan. The village is located very close to Shakargarh city.

Demographics 

Education
Pindi Mana has a primary school for girls and noys organised by the Government of the Punjab.

Transportation

References

External links

Narowal District
Villages in Shakargarh Tehsil